Robert Yost may refer to:
 Robert L. Yost (1922–1990), American diplomat
 Robert M. Yost (1917–2006), philosopher at the University of California in Los Angeles